Asanboni railway station is a railway station on Howrah–Nagpur–Mumbai line under Chakradharpur railway division of South Eastern Railway zone. It is situated at Asanboni, Narayanpur in East Singhbhum  district in the Indian state of Jharkhand.

References

Railway stations in East Singhbhum district
Chakradharpur railway division